Phikmvvirus is a genus of viruses that infect bacteria. There are currently 16 species in this genus including the type species Pseudomonas virus phiKMV.
Bacteriophage phiKMV and its relatives are known to be highly virulent phages, producing large ( diameter) clear plaques on a susceptible host. The only reported exception is phage LKA1, which yields small plaques surrounded by a halo. While all other P. aeruginosa-specific phikmvviruses use the Type IV pili as primary receptor, LKA1 particles attach to the bacterial lipopolysaccharide layer.

Taxonomy
The following species are recognized:
 Pseudomonas virus 130-113
 Pseudomonas virus 15pyo
 Pseudomonas virus Ab05
 Pseudomonas virus ABTNL
 Pseudomonas virus DL62
 Pseudomonas virus kF77
 Pseudomonas virus LKD16
 Pseudomonas virus LUZ19
 Pseudomonas virus MPK6
 Pseudomonas virus MPK7
 Pseudomonas virus NFS
 Pseudomonas virus PAXYB1
 Pseudomonas virus phiKMV
 Pseudomonas virus PT2
 Pseudomonas virus PT5
 Pseudomonas virus RLP

Virology
Although phiKMV phage resembles the well-studied podovirus T7 in overall genome architecture, it was the first known T7-like phage which encoded a single-subunit RNA polymerase gene downstream its DNA metabolism genes instead of in the early genomic region. Based on these properties, the genus Phikmvvirus is classified within the Autographiviridae.

Life cycle
Viral replication is cytoplasmic. Entry into the host cell is achieved by absorption into the host cell. DNA-templated transcription is the method of transcription. The virus exits the host cell by lysis, and  holin/endolysin/spanin proteins. Bacteria serve as the natural host. Transmission routes are passive diffusion.

References

External links
 Viralzone: Phikmvlikevirus
 ICTV

Caudovirales
Virus genera